Ronald Punaoteaoranga Christopher Karaitiana (born 3 December 1987 in Masterton, New Zealand) is a New Zealand cricketer who played in the 2006 U-19 Cricket World Cup in Sri Lanka.  He also made five one-day cricket appearances for Wellington Firebirds in 2008–09, scoring thirteen runs and claiming three wickets.

In 1997, aged nine, Karaitiana won the reality television series McDonald's Young Entertainers.

References

1987 births
Living people
New Zealand cricketers
Wellington cricketers
Cricketers from Masterton
Participants in New Zealand reality television series